Gjert Kristoffersen (13 August 1949 in Arendal – 29 May 2021) was a Norwegian linguist, a phonetician and a professor at the University of Bergen.

His native dialect of Norwegian was Arendalsk.

He was married to librarian and biographer Jan Olav Gatland.

Works

References

1949 births
2021 deaths
People from Arendal
Linguists from Norway
Phoneticians
University of Tromsø alumni
Academic staff of the University of Bergen
Road incident deaths in Norway
Norwegian LGBT people